Methylprednisolone succinate, sold under the brand names Solu-Medrol among others, is a synthetic glucocorticoid corticosteroid and a corticosteroid ester—specifically the C21 succinate ester of methylprednisolone—which is used by intravenous administration. Methylprednisolone succinate is provided as two different salts when used as a pharmaceutical drug: a sodium salt (methylprednisolone sodium succinate; brand name Solu-Medrol, others) and a hydrogen salt (methylprednisolone hemisuccinate or methylprednisolone hydrogen succinate; brand name Urbason).

See also
 List of corticosteroid esters § Methylprednisolone esters

References

Alcohols
Corticosteroid esters
Glucocorticoids
Ketones
Pregnanes
Succinate esters